The 2021 United Rentals 200 was a NASCAR Camping World Truck Series race that was held on October 30, 2021, at Martinsville Speedway in Martinsville, Virginia. Contested over 200 laps on the  paper-clipped shaped oval, it was the 21st race of the 2021 NASCAR Camping World Truck Series season, the sixth race of the Playoffs, and the final race of the Round of 8. GMS Racing driver Zane Smith collected his first win of the season, advancing him to the championship race. Along with Smith, John Hunter Nemechek, Ben Rhodes, and Matt Crafton advanced as well.

Report

Background
Martinsville Speedway is an NASCAR-owned stock car racing track located in Henry County, in Ridgeway, Virginia, just to the south of Martinsville. At  in length, it is the shortest track in the NASCAR Xfinity Series. The track was also one of the first paved oval tracks in NASCAR, being built in 1947 by H. Clay Earles. It is also the only remaining race track that has been on the NASCAR circuit from its beginning in 1948.

Entry list 

 (R) denotes rookie driver.
 (i) denotes driver who is ineligible for series driver points.

Qualifying
John Hunter Nemechek was awarded the pole for the race as determined by competition-based formula. Norm Benning did not have enough points to qualify.

Starting Lineups

Race

Race results

Stage Results 
Stage One
Laps: 50

Stage Two
Laps: 50

Final Stage Results 

Laps:

Race statistics 

 Lead changes: 10 among 4 different drivers
 Cautions/Laps: 14 for 89
 Time of race: 1 hours, 54 minutes, and 9 seconds
 Average speed:

References 

2021 NASCAR Camping World Truck Series
NASCAR races at Martinsville Speedway
2021 in sports in Virginia
United Rentals 200